Majdel el-Aqoura, also known as Majdel is a municipality in the Byblos District of Keserwan-Jbeil Governorate, Lebanon. It is 68 kilometers north of Beirut. Majdel el-Aqoura has an average elevation of 1,220 meters above sea level and a total land area of 1,578 hectares. Its inhabitants are predominantly Maronite Catholics.

References

Populated places in Byblos District
Maronite Christian communities in Lebanon